Abu Khazravi (also Romanized as Abū Khaẕrāvī; also known as Abū Khaẕrārī, Sabzān, and Shelīshāt) is a village in Minubar Rural District, Arvandkenar District, Abadan County, Khuzestan Province, Iran. At the 2006 census, its population was 594, in 116 families.

References 

Populated places in Abadan County